WVTF (89.1 MHz) is a public radio station in Roanoke, Virginia, owned by the Virginia Polytechnic Institute and State University (Virginia Tech) through its fundraising arm, the Virginia Tech Foundation.  It calls itself "Radio IQ," airing a format of news, talk and informational programming from National Public Radio, Public Radio International, the BBC World Service and other sources.  WVTF is a listener-supported station, holding periodic fundraisers on the air.  The studios and offices are on Kingsbury Lane in Roanoke.

WVTF has an effective radiated power (ERP) of 100,000 watts, the maximum for most FM radio stations in the U.S.  The transmitter is on Poor Mountain, off Media Way in Bent Mountain, Virginia.  WVTF broadcasts using HD Radio technology.  The HD-2 digital subchannel carries "WVTF Music" from co-owned 89.9 WWVT-FM Ferrum, Virginia, playing classical music and jazz.  The HD-3 subchannel carries Christian Contemporary music from WRVL Lynchburg, Virginia.  In addition to WVTF, Radio IQ is heard on 16 rebroadcasters and FM translators around Virginia.

History

WVWR-FM
The original call sign was WVWR-FM (Virginia Western Radio) and was licensed to Virginia Western Community College in Roanoke. It was used primarily to air college telecourses and give broadcasting students a chance to hone their skills. 

In 1975, WVWR-FM's transmitter was moved from Fishburn Hall on the VWCC campus to Poor Mountain, where most of Roanoke's major radio and television stations have their transmitters. The power also was increased from 4,100 watts to 100,000 watts. The power boost tripled its coverage area, giving it at least secondary coverage in much of central and southwest Virginia, southern West Virginia and northern North Carolina.  In 1979, WVWR-FM began the Radio Reading Service on its subcarrier frequency.

Virginia Tech Foundation
In 1981, state officials decided that no state agency should directly own a radio station, and Virginia Western was forced to sell. The Virginia Tech Foundation, financially independent of Virginia Tech but controlled by school leadership, expressed interest in buying the station. It not only wanted to preserve public radio in the region, but saw WVWR as a way to increase Virginia Tech's ties to Roanoke. The foundation formally took control in 1982 and initially applied for the call sign WRVT before settling on WVTF. Over the next decade, WVTF built translator after translator to better serve its mostly mountainous coverage area.

From 1980 to 2017, WVTF and its repeaters maintained a schedule typical of full-service public radio stations, with NPR news in drive times, classical music during the day and overnight, and various special music and talk programming on nights and weekends.

Rebranding as Radio IQ

In 2003, WVTF launched Radio IQ in order to provide a secondary schedule consisting only of news/talk programming, including retransmission of the BBC World Service overnight. Radio IQ broadcast over its own network of stations, consisting of extra signals that were overlapped by WVTF's network, as well as those in areas such as Richmond which receive a music and news schedule from another NPR member station. Radio IQ began with WWVT (1260 AM, Christiansburg). The service quickly expanded to WFFC (89.9 FM, Ferrum), the former Ferrum College student radio station, and WVTW (88.5 FM), an extra station in Charlottesville. Radio IQ signed on WRIQ in Lexington in 2011 and purchased WQIQ near Fredericksburg in 2013.

On July 10, 2017, Radio IQ became WVTF's main service, and the station itself rebranded from "WVTF Public Radio" to "Radio IQ". Three of the five existing Radio IQ stations (WVTW, WQIQ, and WRIQ) merged with WVTF and its network (WVTR, WVTU, and WISE-FM) to place the news and talk schedule on as many full-powered signals as possible. A new companion service, WVTF Music, launched on the remaining stations (WWVT and WFFC, later renamed WWVT-FM) and HD2 subchannels of the new combined Radio IQ network. Low-powered translators of the previous WVTF and Radio IQ networks were divided between the two services. WVTF Music took over all music programming, including daily blocks of classical music, specialty local programs, and Live From Here.

WRIQ Richmond 
Radio IQ's programming had been heard in portions of the Greater Richmond Region on low-powered translator W223AZ (92.5 FM) since 2009. In October 2019, WVTF purchased WNVU (89.7 FM) in nearby Charles City, Virginia. That station began simulcasting Radio IQ programming in January 2020 under the new call letters WRIQ.  

WRIQ brings a full-powered Radio IQ signal to Richmond for the first time.  That puts it in direct competition with Richmond-based NPR member WCVE-FM.  WCVE has its own network of rebroadcasters known as the VPM News Service.

Stations

Full power stations
All stations broadcast using HD Radio technology, with "WVTF Music" on its HD2 subchannel.

Notes:

The following stations broadcast Radio IQ on a part-time basis:

Translators
In addition to the main stations, Radio IQ is relayed by an additional 6 translators to widen its broadcast area. It can also be heard on WURV-HD3 in Richmond (which also feeds translator W223AZ).

References

External links
 WVTF Public Radio Online
 Radio IQ
 

Classical music radio stations in the United States
Jazz radio stations in the United States
NPR member stations
American radio networks
Radio stations established in 1973
VTF
VTF
NPR member networks
Public radio stations in the United States
1973 establishments in Virginia
Virginia Tech